Vanndale (formerly Oak Grove) is an unincorporated community and census-designated place (CDP) in Searcy Township, Cross County, Arkansas, United States. It was first listed as a CDP in the 2020 census with a population of 339. Vanndale was the county seat of Cross County from 1886 until 1903, when it was moved to the booming railroad town of Wynne. The community was named for John W. Vann, postmaster. Vanndale was formerly on Highway 1, but has now been bypassed and is on Highway 1B.

Education 
Public education for elementary and secondary students is provided by the Cross County School District, which leads to graduation from Cross County High School. The district's mascot and athletic emblem is the Thunderbird.

The Cross County district was established in 1965 by the merger of the Cherry Valley, Hickory Ridge, and Vanndale school districts. As a part of the Cross County district the community previously had its own elementary school, Vanndale Elementary.

Demographics

2020 census

Note: the US Census treats Hispanic/Latino as an ethnic category. This table excludes Latinos from the racial categories and assigns them to a separate category. Hispanics/Latinos can be of any race.

References

Unincorporated communities in Cross County, Arkansas
Unincorporated communities in Arkansas
Census-designated places in Cross County, Arkansas
Census-designated places in Arkansas